= Manik Chowk, Sitamarhi =

Village in Bihar, India

- Interactive map of Manik Chowk, Sitamarhi
- Elevation: 65 m (213 ft)

Manik Chowk is a village in the Indian state of Bihar.
